Kees "Pier" Tol (born 12 July 1958) is a Dutch retired international footballer who made over 300 professional appearances in the Dutch league, scoring over 100 goals.

Club career
Born in Volendam, Tol played professionally for FC Volendam, AZ'67, Fortuna Sittard and SVV.

International career
Between 1980 and 1982, Tol played five games for the Netherlands national team, including one at the 1980 Mundialito.

Personal life
Tol is the uncle of fellow footballer Kees Tol.

References

External links
 Voetbal International

1958 births
Living people
People from Volendam
Dutch footballers
Footballers from North Holland
Association football forwards
Netherlands international footballers
Eredivisie players
FC Volendam players
AZ Alkmaar players
Fortuna Sittard players
SV SVV players